Morghdari-ye Kasht va Sanat Doab (also Romanized as Morghdārī-ye Kasht va Sanʿat Doāb) is a village in Palangabad Rural District, Palangabad District, Eshtehard County, Alborz Province, Iran. At the 2006 census, its population was 15, in 5 families.

References 

Populated places in Eshtehard County